Hyphydrus ovatus is a species of diving beetles in the family  Dytiscidae.

Description
The body is rust-red, sometimes with indistinct spots. Males have brilliant colors, and the females matt.

Distribution
This species is present in most of Europe, in the East Palearctic ecozone and in the Near East.

Gallery

References

Dytiscidae
Beetles described in 1761
Taxa named by Carl Linnaeus